Vineland Senior High School North is a public high school located in Vineland, in Cumberland County, New Jersey, United States, as part of the Vineland Public Schools. The school opened in 1976.  It holds classes for 9th and 10th grade students, as well a small number of students from other grades.  It is considered to be a different school, but on the same campus of Vineland Senior High School South.

As of the 2005–06 school year, the school had an enrollment of 1,314 students and 122.0 classroom teachers (on an FTE basis), for a student–teacher ratio of 10.8.

Administration
Core members of the school's administration are:
Mrs. DeMarchi, Executive Principal
Mr. Headley, Assistant Principal
Mr. Adams, Assistant Principal
Ms. Craig, Assistant Principal

References

External links 
VHS North Website
Vineland Public Schools

Data for the Vineland Public Schools, National Center for Education Statistics
South Jersey Sports: Vineland HS

1976 establishments in New Jersey
Educational institutions established in 1976
Public high schools in Cumberland County, New Jersey
Vineland, New Jersey